The Divine Word College of Bangued is a private, Catholic higher education institution run by the Philippine Northern Province of the Society of the Divine Word in Bangued, Abra, Philippines. It was founded by a Divine Word Missionary priest in 1920 and given the name Colegio del Sagrado Corazon. In 1964 it was renamed the Divine Word College of Bangued. The college is the most famous in the province.

History
The Divine Word College of Bangued was founded in 1920 by Theodore Buttenbruch a Catholic priest and member of the Society of the Divine Word. That year, Fr. Buttenbruch took over as parish priest of the parish of Bangued when the old parish priest died and felt the need of a catholic school in Bangued. With the help of some prominent men in the parish he founded a coeducational school in a rented house. Initially named Colegio del Sagrado Corazon, it adopted the current name in 1964.

In June 1923, the school was entrusted to the Sister Servants of the Holy Spirit who came to establish their community in Bangued. The old convent (the Holy Spirit Academy at present) was given as their cloister and utilized for additional classrooms.

Course Offerings 
DWCB offers Commission on Higher Education recognized programs in Arts, Education, Accountancy, Biology, Business Administration, Commerce, Computer Secretarial, Health Science Education, Entrepreneurship, Hotel and Restaurant Management, Industrial Engineering, Information Technology, Midwifery, and Nursing.

It also offers master's degrees in education, management, and business administration.

In the 2018/2019 year, the average tuition fee for a bachelor's degree at the DWCB was between 10,000 and 28,000 Philippine pesos.

Administration 
The current president of the Divine Word College is Rev. Fr. Gil Torres Manalo, SVD and is locally known as Fr. Gil. The Finance Officer of the school is Rev. Fr. Ronilo Borja, SVD. And lastly, Rev. Fr. Conradus Haribaik, SVD as the Campus minister.

Campuses 
The main DWCB campus can be found at Rizal St., Zone 6, Bangued 2800, Abra.

See also
Divine Word Academy of Dagupan – Rizal Ext., Dagupan, Pangasinan
Divine Word College of Calapan – Calapan, Oriental Mindoro
Divine Word College of Laoag – Gen. Segundo Ave., Laoag, Ilocos Norte
Divine Word College of Legazpi – Rizal Street, Legazpi, Albay
Divine Word College of San Jose – San Jose, Occidental Mindoro
Divine Word College of Urdaneta – Urdaneta, Pangasinan
Divine Word College of Vigan – Vigan, Ilocos Sur
Divine Word University (DWU) – Tacloban, Leyte; closed in 1995, re-opened as Liceo del Verbo Divino

References

Universities and colleges in Abra (province)
Catholic universities and colleges in the Philippines
Catholic elementary schools in the Philippines
Divine Word Missionaries Order